Victor Auguste de Laveleye (6 November 1894 – 14 December 1945) was a Belgian liberal politician and minister. He also served as announcer on Radio Belgique during World War II.

De Laveleye was a doctor in law, and was municipality Council member of Sint-Gillis, President of the Liberal Party (1936–1937) and Liberal member of parliament (1939–1945) for the district Brussels. De Laveleye was minister of justice (1937) and of public education (1944–1945). During World War II he was newsreader for Radio Belgique, a BBC station transmitted to occupied Belgium.

Biography
Victor de Laveleye was born in Brussels on 6 November 1894. He was a son of Auguste-Albert and Emma Lynen, who belonged to a well-known Antwerp liberal family. He also was a great nephew of the Liege professor Émile Louis Victor de Laveleye.
He studied law at the Free University of Brussels (ULB) and became a lawyer at the Brussels Court of Appeal.

In 1926 he became a municipal councilor in Saint-Gilles, Brussels. He also gave lectures at the ULB and was a reporter at the Liberal Congress in 1932. He became a member of parliament, chairman of the Liberal Party (1936–1937) and for a few months Minister of Justice in Paul Van Zeeland's second government (1937).

In 1940 he fled to London via France. At the end of July 1940 he received the proposal to take charge of the broadcasts of the BBC that were intended for German-occupied Belgium. On 28 September 1940, the first broadcast of Radio Belgique was aired.

V sign

In a radio broadcast on 14 January 1941, de Laveleye asked all Belgians to use the letter "V" as a rallying sign, being the first letter of victoire (victory) in French and of vrijheid (freedom) in Dutch. This was the beginning of the "V campaign" which saw "V" graffities on the walls of Belgium and later all of Europe and introduced the use of the "V sign" for victory and freedom. Winston Churchill adopted the sign soon afterwards, though he sometimes got it the wrong way around by displaying the back of his hand, a gesture that is widely used in Great Britain as a lewd and vulgar insult (it means "fuck off").

Later life
After the liberation Victor de Laveleye became Minister of Public Education in the governments Pierlot V and VI, who did not last for five months (September 1944 – February 1945). He was already ill and on 16 December 1945, being 51 years old, he died.

Sports
He competed for Belgium in tennis at the 1920 and 1924 Summer Olympics and was an alternate, who did not play, on the Belgian 1928 hockey team. He was nephew of Baron Edouard de Laveleye, chairman of the Belgian Olympic Committee.

References

External links
 

1894 births
1945 deaths
Belgian politicians
Belgian people in the United Kingdom during World War II
Walloon sportspeople
Belgian male tennis players
Belgian radio presenters
Belgian radio journalists
Olympic tennis players of Belgium
Tennis players at the 1920 Summer Olympics
Tennis players at the 1924 Summer Olympics
Sportspeople from Brussels
Free University of Brussels (1834–1969) alumni